The  Orquestra Simfònica del Vallès , founded in 1987, is a symphony orchestra based in Sabadell, Spain. The principal conductor of the orchestra is Xavier Puig.

See also 
 Barcelona Symphony and Catalonia National Orchestra
 L'auditori
 Sabadell

External links
 Official Website (in Catalan)

References

Catalan orchestras
Musical groups established in 1987